The White Rose Centre is a shopping centre in the Beeston area of  Leeds, West Yorkshire, England. It spans two floors and is near the M621 motorway. It takes its name from the White Rose of York, the traditional symbol of Yorkshire. Most shops are situated on the Ground Floor. The Upper Level mezzanine and ‘The Village’ outdoor expansion houses one of two food courts as well some retail outlets, a Cineworld 11-screen cinema, a Starbucks and an al fresco dining terrace boasting new tenants Wagamama, Prezzo, TGI Fridays and Five Guys among others. It also houses an outdoor children’s play area. Although the centre is smaller than other out-of-town shopping centres, it has attracted large retailers such as Next, JD Sports, Zara, River Island and Marks and Spencer.

The centre opened on 25 March 1997 and now accommodated major tenants including Sainsbury's, Marks & Spencer, Next, WHSmith, Primark, Zara, H&M, New Look, Footasylum, Boots and most recently Sky, with over 100 other stores and services. It contains eatery’s such as a McDonald's, KFC, Nando's, Starbucks, Subway, Frankie & Benny's, Chiquito, TGI Fridays, Graveleys, Five Guys, Krispy Kreme and multiple Costa Coffee’s. 

The centre has 4,800 free car parking spaces, security and on-site police officers.

The south part of the centre was re-developed in 2005 downsizing the Sainsbury's Savacentre to a regular Sainsbury's which made space for other units. Argos was moved into Sainsbury’s in 2019. 

The centre has a bus station at the north end of the mall connecting it to suburban areas of Leeds and to the city centre.

To coincide with its tenth year of trading the White Rose Centre was rebranded. Its logo, advertising, signage and staff uniforms were redesigned. The branding and strategic marketing campaign won a BCSC Purple Apple award.

The centre is managed and mainly by Land Securities and Evans of Leeds. It has also won awards including a British Council of Shopping Centre's (BCSC) Gold Award, BCSC Purple apple, and Green apple awards.

In 2020, during the COVID-19 pandemic in the United Kingdom, the centre suffered the loss of two of its major tenants and most popular stores. Both Debenhams and Topshop closed all stores worldwide and went into administration. The centre also lost a Disney Store, Thorntons and a Thomas Cook travel store.

It was announced in November 2021 that Marks and Spencer would be upsizing and moving into the old Debenhams anchor unit at the north end of the centre. The department unit will be refurbished along with the existing cafés and restaurant and is expected to open in 2022.

Construction
Before building work began in 1995, enabling works including removing the sewage works, sealing disused mine shafts, removing contaminated soil and profiling the sloping site, were carried out. It required moving 750,000 cubic metres of soil to grade a 30-metre fall across the site and create level terraces for the structure and car parks. Work commenced on the 87-week project on 10 July 1995 and by September the first steelwork was visible. 600 semi-mature, seven-metre-high trees were purchased from Germany and planted in the car park to provide landscaping. Five thousand trees and shrubs have been planted around the car parks and perimeter roads.

Dining

The Balcony Food Court takes up most of the upper floor in the central atrium. It includes McDonald's, KFC, Subway, Spud-u-like, Bagel Nash, Juice, Nando's, Frankie & Benny's and Pizza Express plus a number of other food outlets

In 2015 the White Rose extended the entrance to the upper level between car park 4 and 5 which  created 3 new restaurants which have changed since opening.

The Balcony leads to a newly constructed area of the centre known as The Village. This includes further eateries namely Pizza Hut, Five Guys, Limeyard, Wagamama, Chiquito and TGI Friday's.

Community
The White Rose Centre is involved in a number of social welfare activities in the local area.  Older people are able to participate in mall walking within the covered environment.  It houses the White Rose Learning Centre run in conjunction with Education Leeds and Leeds City College to provide dance classes and other educational activities for children at risk of exclusion from school in an informal environment.
The Quiet Room in the Upper Circle is available for use by all patrons and staff during the Centre opening hours.

Criticisms 
Criticism has been levelled at the lack of a railway station, despite the centre's proximity to the Huddersfield and Wakefield railway lines. Plans to add a station have been developed and the go ahead to begin construction is expected in 2022.

Past and future expansion
In 2015 the White Rose extended the entrance to the upper level between car park 4 and 5 which  created 3 new restaurants as well leading to the balcony and a new entrance to what would later be incorporated into 'The Village'.

In 2017 a  £25 million extension was completed and named 'The Village'. It included an 11-screen IMAX Cineworld Cinema, a number of new restaurants including; Pizza Hut, Chiquito, Wagamama, Five Guys, Limeyard and TGI Fridays. A children's outdoor play area opened in 'The Village' in 2018.

As mentioned previously, plans to add a small railway station have been developed and the go ahead to begin construction is expected in 2022.

References

External links

White Rose Centre Website
White Rose Centre on The Retail Database
White Rose Centre Map

Shopping centres in Leeds
Morley, West Yorkshire